Aimable Nsabimana (born 6 July 1997) is a Rwandan professional footballer who plays as a central defender for Minerva Punjab in the I-League and the Rwanda national football team.

Club career
The versatile defender had joined APR in July 2016 from Marines FC and went on to become a key member  of the military side before he was ravaged by a series of injuries since the beginning of the 2017/2018 season. During his two-year stint with APR, the hard-hitting defender helped the club to clinch Peace Cup and the league titles.

Minerva Punjab
In September 2018, he joined I-League club Minerva Punjab FC.

International career
He made his debut for the national team on 15 July 2017 in the 2018 African Nations Championship qualification 2nd round match against Tanzania.

Career statistics

Honours
Armée Patriotique Rwandaise
Rwanda National Football League: 2015–16

References

1997 births
Living people
Rwandan footballers
Rwanda international footballers
Association football defenders
Expatriate footballers in India
RoundGlass Punjab FC players
Rwanda A' international footballers
2020 African Nations Championship players
Rwandan expatriate sportspeople in India
Rwandan expatriate footballers
APR F.C. players